Ilya Isidorovich Fondaminsky (Илья′ Исидо′рович Фондами′нский, February 17, 1880, Moscow, Russia — November 19, 1942, Auschwitz, Nazi-occupied Poland), was a  Russian author (writing under the pseudonym I. Bunakov) and political activist, in 1910s one of the leaders of the Esers party, in 1917 a senior member of the Alexander Kerensky's Provisional government.

In 1918, Fondaminsky took part in the Iași Conference. In Paris, where he has been living since 1919, Fondaminsky veered off from the left and became an influential newspaper editor (Sovremennye Zapisky, among others), author of philosophical essays and in the later years — much admired philanthropist, supporting Christian magazines and charity funds. In his biography of Mother Maria Skobtsova, Pearl of Great Price, Father Serge Hackel wrote that Fondaminsky gave occasional lectures at the Sunday afternoon gatherings at the house on the Rue de Lourmel.

Facing the Nazi occupation, Fondaminsky refused to leave Paris, saying he would accept his destiny whatever it would be. Arrested in July 1941 as a Jew and sent to the concentration camp, he adopted Christianity and was received into the Russian Orthodox Church not long before being sent to Auschwitz. Ilya Fondaminsky died there on November 19, 1942, aged 62. In 2003, he was officially pronounced a Russian Orthodox saintly martyr by the Patriarch of Constantinople.

References

External links 
 Who is St Ilya Fondaminsky?. - Ilya Fondaminsky @ In Communion, website of the Orthodox Peace fellowship.

1880 births
1942 deaths
Politicians from Moscow
People from Moskovsky Uyezd
Russian Jews
Converts to Eastern Orthodoxy from Judaism
Socialist Revolutionary Party politicians
Russian Constituent Assembly members
White Russian emigrants to France
French people of Russian-Jewish descent
Jewish socialists
Politicians who died in Nazi concentration camps
20th-century Eastern Orthodox martyrs